Soyaniquilpan de Juárez is a municipality in the State of Mexico in Mexico. The municipal seat is San Francisco Soyaniquilpan.  The municipality covers an area of  140.77 km².

As of 2005, the municipality had a total population of 10,719.

References

Municipalities of the State of Mexico
Populated places in the State of Mexico